John King II (born April 1, 1988) is an American professional stock car racing driver.

Early career 
Born in Fort Blackmore, Virginia, King grew up in Kingsport, Tennessee. King began his racing career in 2006, competing in local late model series in eastern Tennessee and southwestern Virginia; in 2007, he participated in the Fastrak Racing Series Grand Nationals, finishing in the top 30 among over 200 drivers entered in the three-race series.

In 2009, King moved up to the UARA-STARS Late Model Series, as part of his participation in the Bill Elliott Driver Development Program.

During his early career King scored two wins in all series combined, one on a dirt track and the other on an asphalt course.

NASCAR 
King made his debut in the NASCAR Camping World Truck Series in 2010, competing at Bristol Motor Speedway and finishing fifteenth. He made six additional starts in the Camping World Truck Series through 2010 and 2011 before signing with Red Horse Racing to drive the team's No. 7 truck for the 2012 season. Chad Kendrick is the No. 7 truck's crew chief.

He started the 2012 season by winning the series' biggest race, the NextEra Energy Resources 250 at Daytona International Speedway, leading a one-two finish by Red Horse Racing as teammate Timothy Peters finished second. King had been involved in two crashes over the course of the race, one of them taking out then-leader Johnny Sauter; the event ran through three attempted green-white-checkered finishes before ending under the yellow flag. The win came in King's eighth start in the series, and King stated that the win was only the third of his entire career.

Following a ninth-place finish in the season's second race at Martinsville Speedway, King struggled in the following three events, crashing twice; following the May race at Charlotte Motor Speedway, Red Horse Racing announced that it was indefinitely suspending operations of the No. 7 truck, due to a lack of sponsorship, leaving King out of a ride.

In September 2012, King returned to the Camping World Truck Series, driving the No. 5 truck for Wauters Motorsports at Kentucky Speedway.

In 2013, King drove for Eddie Sharp Racing in the season-opening race at Daytona, finishing eighteenth.

In February 2014, King announced that he would drive for NTS Motorsports in the season-opening Truck Series race at Daytona that month, finishing 23rd.

Motorsports career results

NASCAR
(key) (Bold – Pole position awarded by qualifying time. Italics – Pole position earned by points standings or practice time. * – Most laps led.)

Camping World Truck Series 

 Season still in progress
 Ineligible for series points

References

External links
 
 

Living people
1988 births
People from Scott County, Virginia
Racing drivers from Virginia
NASCAR drivers